Stephan Tauschitz (9 July 1889 in Hörtendorf – 28 March 1970 in Klagenfurt) was an Austrian politician (Landbund) and farmer.

Tauschitz was born in Hörtendorf, which was a village, but was later included into Klagenfurt. After high school (Realschule) in Klagenfurt, he studied at Vienna University of Technology, where he graduated in 1922. 

He was a member of National Council from 1927 to 1930. He went on to become Gauleiter of the Heimwehr, but later quit his membership.

References

TU Wien alumni
1889 births
1970 deaths
Foreign ministers of Austria
Members of the National Council (Austria)
Ambassadors of Austria to Argentina
Ambassadors of Austria to Paraguay
Ambassadors of Austria to Uruguay
People from Carinthia (state)
Ambassadors of Austria to Greece